William Squire (29 April 1917 – 3 May 1989) was a Welsh actor of stage, film and television.

Squire was born in Neath, Glamorgan, the son of William Squire and his wife Martha (née Bridgeman).

Career
As a stage actor, Squire performed at Stratford-upon-Avon and at the Old Vic, and notably replaced his fellow-countryman Richard Burton as King Arthur in Camelot at the Majestic Theatre on Broadway. One of his first film appearances was in the 1956 film Alexander the Great, which starred Burton in the title role.

His varied screen roles included Thomas More in the 1969 film version of Maxwell Anderson's play Anne of the Thousand Days, Sir Daniel Brackley in the 1972 television adaptation of Robert Louis Stevenson's The Black Arrow, the voice of Gandalf in the 1978 animated version of The Lord of the Rings and the Shadow in the 1979 Doctor Who serial The Armageddon Factor. Perhaps his best-known role was as Hunter, the superior of secret agent David Callan in the spy series Callan in the early 1970s; Squire took over the role from Derek Bond.

In a set of Encyclopædia Britannica-produced educational films about William Shakespeare's Macbeth, Squire played the role of Macbeth. This was in keeping with his long career as a Shakespearean actor, which included roles in the classic 1960s TV series, An Age of Kings.

In 1967 William Squire collaborated with fellow Welshman and St. John's College, Cambridge Organist and Director of Music George Guest on the LP recording of readings and carols, A Meditation on Christ's Nativity (Argo Records [UK] ZRG 550, released in 1968). Readings included poems: The Annunciation, John Donne; A Dialogue, George Herbert; On the Morning of Christ's Nativity (extract), John Milton; Chanticleer, William Austin; The Burning Babe, Robert Southwell; The Guest, Thomas Ford and Journey of the Magi, T.S. Eliot. Also read were extracts from Shakespeare's Hamlet I.i: "Some say that ever 'gainst that season comes" and the New English Bible translation of 1 John 1:1-10. This recording may be heard here.

Personal life
He was first married to the actress Betty Dixon. He married the actress Juliet Harmer in 1967.

There is a park bench on Hampstead Heath dedicated to him.

Death
Squire died in London, England, of unnamed causes on 3 May 1989, four days after his 72nd birthday.

Filmography

External links
 
 
William Squire Interview with his son Nick and mp3 ads as “Frobisher Collingwood “ http://www.offshoreradio.co.uk/odds88.htm

References

1917 births
1989 deaths
People from Neath
Welsh male stage actors
Welsh male film actors
Welsh male television actors
Welsh male voice actors
20th-century Welsh male actors